Michael Saunders is a British economist with Citigroup. In August 2016 he became an external member of the Bank of England's Monetary Policy Committee, replacing Martin Weale.

Saunders studied econometrics at the London School of Economics (LSE).

Saunders worked for a short time as an economist at Greenwell Montagu (now HSBC) and the Institute for Fiscal Studies, before joining Citigroup, in 1990, rising to become Head of European Economics.

References

Year of birth missing (living people)
Living people
Alumni of the London School of Economics
British economists
Monetary Policy Committee members